The Campo Conde de Sucena (meaning in English "Count of Sucena Field") is located within the Count of Sucena Sports Complex in Sintra. It is a football stadium with capacity for 1,000 spectators and is the home of the S.U. 1º Dezembro club.

Tenants
Both the men's football team and the women's football team play their home games in the Field. The club's youth teams competing in official leagues also play home games in this Field.

The neighbouring URCA football club also uses the Field for their home games.

See also
 Complexo Desportivo Conde de Sucena
 S.U. 1º Dezembro
 S.U. 1º Dezembro (women)
 Sevenfoot

External links
 Conde de Sucena Field at Zerozero.pt Website
 Official Facebook Page
 Official Website

References

Conde de Sucena
S.U. 1º Dezembro
Sports venues in Lisbon District
Sport in Sintra
1935 establishments in Portugal
Buildings and structures in Sintra
Sports venues completed in 1935